Christopher John Bartlett (born 12 October 1931) is a British historian and biographer.

He was born in Bournemouth and educated at University College, Exeter, where he gained a BA in history in 1953. He was awarded a PhD in international history by the London School of Economics in 1956. From 1957 to 1959 he was assistant lecturer at the University of Edinburgh. He was then lecturer in Modern History at the University of the West Indies (1959–1962) and Queen's College, Dundee(1962–1968). Afterwards, he was reader in international history (1968–1978). In 1978 he was appointed Professor of International History at the University of Dundee, from which he retired in 1996.

Works
Great Britain and Sea Power, 1815-1853 (Oxford: Clarendon Press, 1963).
 
(editor), Britain Pre-eminent: Studies in British World Influence in the Nineteenth Century (London: Macmillan, 1969).
The Long Retreat: A Short History Defence Policy, 1945-1970 (London: Macmillan, 1972).
The Rise and Fall of the Pax Americana (London: Paul Elek, 1974).
A History of Postwar Britain, 1945-1974 (London: Longmans, 1977).

Notes

1931 births
British historians
Living people
Alumni of the London School of Economics
University of the West Indies academics